Karaulov is a Russian masculine surname, its feminine counterpart is Karaulova. It may refer to
Ivan Karaulov (born 1980), Kazakhstani ski jumper
 Sergei Karaulov (born 1982), Uzbekistani-Russian basketball player
Yulianna Karaulova (born 1988), Russian singer

Russian-language surnames